David Beigelman (1887 – February 1945), also known as Dawid Bajgelman and Dawid Beigelman, was a Polish violinist, orchestra leader, and composer of Yiddish theatre music and songs.

Biography 
He was born in Ostrowiec, Congress Poland to a musical family in Łódź where he composed and performed in Yiddish theatres at a young age. He became director of the Lodz Yiddish Theater in 1912.

He wrote the music for Julius Adler's operettas Dos Skoytn-meydl and Di mume Gnendil and Yankev Vaksman's Di Sheyne Berta, all of which were staged in Łódź, and arranged the music for S. Ansky's The Dybbuk. In 1929 he was composer and music director for the Ararat Theater in Łódź.

In 1940 he was forced to move to the Ghetto Litzmannstadt in Łódź, where he took part in the ghetto's cultural life as a conductor – the ghetto's first symphony concert was performed under his direction on 1 March 1941 – and as a composer of orchestral works and songs. Two well-known Beigelman songs that have survived and are performed to this day are Kinder yorn (the years of childhood) and Tsigaynerlid (Gypsy Song), dedicated to the Romani living in the ghetto. He wrote songs to lyrics by Isaiah Spiegel including Makh tsu di eygelekh (Close Your Little Eyes) and Nisht keyn rozhinkes, nisht keyn mandlen (No raisins, no almonds). He also collaborated with Moishe Broderzon writing well-known songs such as Nisim, nisim and Yidn, Shmidn. He also collaborated with Moyshe Nudelman, David Herman, and Yakov Rotbaum.

In 1944, Beigelman was deported to Auschwitz, where he died in February 1945.

See also 
Jewish ghettos in German-occupied Poland
List of Nazi-German concentration camps
The Holocaust in Poland
World War II casualties of Poland

References

External links
 Portrait photo, undated. From the collection of Jonas Turkow, archives of the Ghetto Fighters' House

1887 births
1945 deaths
Jewish cabaret performers
Musicians from Łódź
Polish Jews who died in the Holocaust
Polish cabaret performers
Polish composers
Jewish composers
Jewish songwriters
Yiddish theatre
Polish violinists
Male violinists
Jewish violinists
Łódź Ghetto inmates
Polish people who died in Auschwitz concentration camp
Polish civilians killed in World War II
20th-century comedians
20th-century violinists
20th-century male musicians